Hexalectris grandiflora, the largeflower crested coralroot or giant coral-root, is a species of orchid native to Mexico from Chihuahua south to Oaxaca, as well as to western and north-central Texas. It is a myco-heterotrophic species, lacking chlorophyll and subsisting entirely on nutrients obtained by fungi in the soil.

References

Bletiinae
Myco-heterotrophic orchids
Orchids of the United States
Orchids of Mexico
Flora of Texas
Plants described in 1845